Minnal Murali is a 2021 Indian Malayalam-language superhero film directed by Basil Joseph and produced by Sophia Paul, under the banner of Weekend Blockbusters. The screenplay is written by Arun Anirudhan and Justin Mathew. The film stars Tovino Thomas and Guru Somasundaram. The story follows the life of Jaison, a young tailor who gains superpowers after being struck by lightning, and transforms into a superhero. 

The film was formally announced in January 2019, but due to the extensive pre-production works, the film's principal photography took place during December 2019. Though shooting got disrupted twice following the two waves of the COVID-19 pandemic and the vandalism of a church set by right-wing groups, the makers managed to complete the shoot within July 2021. The film was predominantly shot in Kerala, with few sequences being shot at Hassan in Karnataka. The film score was composed by Sushin Shyam while the songs featured in the film were composed by Shaan Rahman and Sushin Shyam. The cinematography was by Sameer Thahir and while Livingston Mathew served as the editor.

The film was set for a theatrical release in late-2020, but was postponed multiple times due to the COVID-19 pandemic. In September 2021, the makers announced that the film will be released directly through the streaming platform Netflix, as a result of closure of theatres due to the pandemic. It was premiered at the Mumbai Film Festival on 16 December, and was premiered worldwide on the occasion of Christmas Eve (24 December 2021). It received critical acclaim praising the cast performances (particularly Tovino Thomas and Guru Somasundaram), writing, direction, action sequences, VFX and soundtrack.

Plot
In 1990s, Jaison, A young tailor from the village of Kurukkanmoola, is in dreams of building a career in the US. SI Saajan forbids Jaison's relationship with his daughter Bincy, as she is already engaged to Aneesh. Aneesh's ex-girlfriend Bruce Lee Biji is also enraged that Aneesh had broken up with her. Meanwhile, Shibu is a social outcast, who works in a teashop and he was waiting 28 years for the returning of his childhood sweetheart Usha, who is also the sister of Daasan. Daasan works in Jaison's and his father Varkey's tailor shop. Usha has a daughter, who needs an urgent medical operation, but she does not have that much cash for the operation. On Christmas Eve, a lightning bolt simultaneously strikes Jaison, who is arguing with Saajan, and Shibu, who is stalking Usha. Jaison is rushed to the hospital,  but to everyone's surprise, he is seemingly unharmed. In the following days, Jaison and Shibu show signs of superpowers. Jaison's nephew, Josemon, comes to the conclusion that Jaison gained superpowers after being hit by the lightning. 

Usha comes to Shibu's teashop where the owner flirt with Usha. Shibu is enraged and threatens him with his new telekinetic powers, asking him to stay away from her. Meanwhile, Jaison's plans to leave to the US come to an unexpected halt after his passport verification doesn't go through after Saajan meddles with it and also reveals that Varkey is not Jaison's father and his real father is Martin, a theatre actor who died while Jaison was young when the set of the village play caught fire. Varkey saw the young Jaison and felt pity for him, raising Jaison as his own son. Jaison is heartbroken after hearing the news. Varkey tells Jaison that he didn't reveal the truth earlier as he feared that Jaison would abandon him and his father helped everyone in the village and died for the sake of village. Jaison realizes that Saajan had hit Varkey and is enraged. With the help of Josemon, Jaison disguises himself with a mask and goes to Josemon's school's anniversary where many policemen, including Saajan and Pothan, are present as the security for the chief guest. 

Jaison, wearing the costume, attacks Saajan and the policeman including Biji, who tried to stop him. He writes the name Minnal Murali on the front curtain of the stage the anniversary event was held, which was named after a character in Martin's unfinished play. Usha's daughter faints and is taken to the hospital. The doctor tells Usha that her daughter needs to start the operation on her now or else she might die. Shibu learns of this and disguise himself as Minnal Murali and robs the local bank at the same time when Jaison attacked Saajan. When Shibu provides the money to the hospital, He learns that Daasan had already paid for it. Meanwhile, Siby Pothan, Jaison's brother-in-law finds out that Jaison is Minnal Murali, but Saajan does not believe him. Jaison had been saving money that was given by his sister for applying for visa, keeping it in his tailor shop, but it was stolen by Daasan. Jaison gives a deadline to Daasan that he should bring him the money back before evening. 

Meanwhile, Usha slowly warms up to Shibu, but Daasan rejects him. Jaison realizes his mistake and goes to Daasan to apologize. Shibu comes to Jaison's store and accused Daasan of being the obstacle between his and Usha's relationship and burns down the store, killing Daasan, and then blames Minnal Murali for the crime. Jaison reveals to Biji that he is Minnal Murali. Biji and Josemon decide to help Jaison prove to the villagers that he is not the one who robbed the bank and killed Daasan while also finding the imposter. The police and Jaison view footage of the store on the night when Daasan died, at the police station to check the identity of 'Minnal Murali,' but the power goes out the exact moment they are about to find Shibu. Shibu, wearing a mask, ambushes the police station in an attempt to destroy the video, the only evidence to show that he is the impostor, but Jaison as Minnal Murali attacks him and steals the video cassette.

Jaison and Shibu fight at the moving bus, where Shibu bests Jaison due to him having telekinesis, which Jaison does not have. Shibu destroys the cassette and escapes. However, in the altercation, the bus driver hits his head and dies, which leads to the bus not stopping before reaching the edge of a cliff, dangling precariously off of it, but Jaison saves the bus, which gains him a few villagers's respect. Jaison and Shibu start investigating and they learn about each other's identity. Saajan and the force arrive to arrest Shibu as they learn that Shibu is the impersonator, but Shibu scares them away. Pothan finds a picture of Minnal Murali and shows it to Saajan. Saajan believes Pothan's findings and Pothan arrests Jaison. Usha comes to Shibu's house and realizes Shibu's love for her and reciprocates it. Shibu sees a mob outside his home and tries to stop them, but unknown to Shibu, his house slowly catches on fire. A barrel full of firecrackers catch fire, causing his house to explode, killing Usha and her daughter and injuring Shibu.

A grief-stricken and psychotic Shibu, goes to a church and kills people while trapping others, including Josemon, planning to burn them alive as vengeance. The police is alerted about the situation, and Saajan releases Jaison as he realizes that Jaison is the only one who can stop Shibu. Jaison wears a supersuit, goes to the church, and confronts Shibu. Jaison succumbs to Shibu's telekinesis once again, but Jaison has second wind after remembering his father and his sacrifice for the village and villagers, awakening his own telekinesis powers. Jaison and Shibu clash again, ending in Jaison impaling Shibu with a spear, killing Shibu instantly. While saddened over his death, Jaison finally gets appreciation from the villagers, while Biji puts out the fire. In a voice-over, Jaison tells that more monsters will arrive in the future, but Minnal Murali will be there to protect the villagers.

Cast

Tovino Thomas in a dual role as:
  Jaison Varghese / Minnal Murali, a tailor who gets struck by lightning and gains superpowers.
 Awan Pookot as a Young Jaison
 Martin Rangakala, a theatre artist and Jaison's biological father
 Guru Somasundaram as Shibu, a social outcast, who works in a teashop who also gets struck by lightning and gains superpowers 
 Aju Varghese as P. C. Siby Pothan, Jaison's brother-in-law
 Vasisht Umesh as Josemon, Jaison's  nephew and Pothan's  son
 Femina George as "Bruce Lee" Biji, a travel agent and a karate instructor, who is Aneesh's ex-girlfriend
 Shelly Kishore as Usha, Daasan's sister and Shibu's childhood sweetheart
 Thennal Abhilash as Appumol, Pothan's daughter 
 Baiju as S.I. Sajan Antony, the head sub-inspector of Kurukanmoola and Bincy's father
 Harisree Ashokan as Daasan, a tailor who works along with Jaison and is Usha's brother
 P. Balachandran as Varkey, Jaison's foster father
 Arya Salim as Jesmi, Jaison's foster sister
 Sneha Babu as Bincy, Jaison's ex-girlfriend who later gets married to Aneesh
 Jude Anthany Joseph as Aneesh, Biji's ex-boyfriend who later marries Bincy
 Mamukkoya as Doctor Sambashivan
 Sudheesh as himself (cameo)
 Bijukuttan as Kunjan
 Azees Nedumangad as Chandran
 Rajesh Madhavan as P.C. Titto
 Benzi Mathews as a young Varkey
 Gibin Gopinath as P.C. Dasan
 Harish Pengan as Varieth
 Devi Chandana as Bindhu
 Syam Cargoz as Panchayat Member
 Pauly Valsan as Villager
 Vishnu Soman as Hari
 Surjith Gopinath as Paachan 
 Basil Joseph as a young politician (cameo appearance)

Production

Development 
In January 2019, Tovino Thomas announced that he will collaborate with Basil Joseph for the second time after Godha (2017), for a superhero film titled Minnal Murali and Sophia Paul bankrolled this project under the Weekend Blockbusters banner. The concept poster of this film was revealed on 21 January 2019, coinciding with the actor's birthday. Basil Joseph worked on the script for the film, while Tovino became busy on his commitments in the upcoming projects. As Tovino completed works on his films, in late-October 2019, Basil Joseph started pre-production works of the film and script reading sessions had consequently began. Arun Anirudhan and Justin Mathew co-wrote the script of the film. Basil Joseph stated that the film drew inspiration from My Dear Kuttichathan (1984).

Basil took supervision of the computer graphics-aspect during the film's scripting stage. In an interview with The Times of India, he said that "I will be working closely with the VFX team in the pre-production stage for developing the storyboards as well as understanding what is possible before we start shooting the movie". Tovino Thomas said that the film falls on the comedy genre, despite being a superhero film and will be "enjoyable to all kinds of audiences". He also said that "the team had planned to present the fantasy element convincingly and realistic in some manner", by saying "If you search online, you would find several instances of those struck by a lightning, experiencing differences in their lives like being able to make a bulb glow for a second or their watches stopping. So, when high voltage courses through the body its dynamics change somewhat. In that way, it's also a realistic movie."

Casting 
During July 2019, Aju Varghese was roped in as one of the cast members in pivotal role. Varghese shared a casting call for the film's lead actress, and invited applications from the age of 20 and 28. In the process, the team had cast Femina George as the heroine, whose character named as "Bruce Lee" Biji. Tamil actor Guru Somasundaram joined the film in a pivotal role. Hollywood stunt choreographer Vlad Rimburg was roped in to supervise the action sequences. The technical crew consisted of cinematographer Sameer Thahir, music directors Shaan Rahman and Sushin Shyam and editor Livingston Mathew. Tovino Thomas trained immensely for his role in this film in order to play the role of a superhero.

Filming 
The film began production in December 2019 with a puja ceremony and principal photography subsequently began. The team planned to shoot major sequences in Wayanad and Alappuzha districts. After completing major schedules in Alappuzha, the team headed to Wayanad to shoot the sequences further, where few portions were shot in Manathavady during February 2020. The schedule was halted due to the COVID-19 pandemic lockdown in India announced in March 2020. The shoot was resumed a year later in March 2021 in Karnataka, where a huge church set has been replicated, similar to that of a set erected in Kalady by the art direction team, which was vandalised by right-wing groups in May 2020. The team continued their shooting progress in Hassan during the same month, but was halted in April 2021 after Tovino Thomas got diagnosed with COVID-19, and adding to the factors were, the second wave of the pandemic with cases uprising in Kerala. The team resumed shooting in July 2021, when the Kerala government granted permissions to resume film shoots, but was halted immediately as the team found to be violating the COVID-19 protocol. The shooting of this film was wrapped up on 25 July 2021, with the producer Sophia Paul confirming this in an Instagram post. Post-production works simultaneously began and the film's final edit was ready by mid-September 2021.

 Vandalism of film set

On 24 May 2020, a temporary church that had been built as part of the film's set near Kalady was vandalized by right-wing groups. The set was made at a cost of around ₹50 lakh. Several activists of Antharashtra Hindu Parishad (AHP) and Bajrang Dal took credit for destroying the Church-replica by posting on their social media pages about it. AHP's general secretary, Hari Palode, said in a Facebook post that members of AHP, along with members of Bajrang Dal, had demolished the temporary church set as it was placed opposite to a temple. Palode also congratulated the district president of Bajrang Dal, Ernakulam for taking part in the "service work" of razing the church.

Six men, including the leader of Rashtriya Bajarang Dal, have been arrested. All of the accused were levied with sections including seeking to create communal disharmony and robbery. The prime accused in the case, who was previously arrested, was accused of 3 murder cases and many murder attempts. Many from the Malayalam film industry criticized the vandalism. Kerala's chief minister, Pinarayi Vijayan, said that Kerala is no place for games of the communal forces. The vandalism of the film set had incurred financial losses for the production team.

The team resumed shooting for the portions scheduled at Kalady at Hemavati Reservoir with the backdrop of Shettihalli Rosary Church and additional sets created by the production team. Most of the climax portions were shot in this location.

Music

The film score was composed by Sushin Shyam. The film features eight songs composed by Shaan Rahman and Sushin Shyam, with both the composers contributing to four tracks each for the album. Manu Manjith served as the primary lyricist for the film songs. The soundtrack album was released by Muzik 247 on 24 November 2021.

In the review for The Times of India, Deepa Soman stated that "the songs are also both groovy and melodious and placed well in the storyline". Devarsi Ghosh of Hindustan Times reviewed the songs as "fabulous", with the titular track in particular. Sajin Srijith of The New Indian Express stated the soundtrack as "instantly addictive" and "carries the goodness of western retro hits".

Awards & Nominations

Release

Streaming 
Minnal Murali was initially set for theatrical release but had to be rescheduled multiple times in response to the closures of theatres due to COVID-19 pandemic lockdown in India. In July 2021, Netflix acquired the digital streaming rights of the film and planned to stream the film only after 45 days of its theatrical run. However, following the impact of COVID-19 lockdown and the escalation of costs due to the delayed production, the film's producer Sophia Paul opted for a direct-to-streaming release, which was officially confirmed by Netflix in September 2021. On 24 September, the producers announced that Minnal Murali will release worldwide on 24 December 2021, coinciding with Christmas Eve, and will be dubbed and released in Tamil, Telugu, Kannada, Hindi and English along with the original version.

Premiere
Before the film's digital release, actress Priyanka Chopra who was the chairperson of the Mumbai Film Festival (scheduled for 16 December 2021), announced its world premiere on the 2021 edition of the film festival. This was confirmed by Netflix, which released a live online interaction with Tovino, Joseph, Chopra and Smriti Kiran, who was the artistic director of MAMI. The premiere saw the attendance of many noted celebrities including Harshvardhan Kapoor, Abhimanyu Dassani, Malavika Mohanan and film critic Anupama Chopra, which received positive reception.

Marketing
On 25 September 2021, coinciding with the third edition of Tudum festival sponsored by Netflix, a featurette titled World of Minnal Murali, which has Tovino Thomas and Basil Joseph, sharing an interview about the film was premiered during the live event. For the promotions of the film, Muthoot Group announced an advertising campaign under the title "Minnatte Life", and an advertisement film based on the film's theme was featured.

Prior to the release, the team further collaborated with professional wrestler The Great Khali and cricketer Yuvraj Singh for the promotions of Minnal Murali. A comic book strip inspired from the film was featured in the Malayala Manorama newspaper, four days prior to the release. The audio-visual logo montage of the film was advertised at Ain Dubai, the world's tallest observation wheel located at Dubai, United Arab Emirates. A fan-based bus painting the logo of the film, and named as Minnal Murali Express, were used as part of promoting the film. A parody of the film, presented by Kerala Police, on how the department dealing crimes against women, traffic rule violation, accident prevention and apart from the fictional premise, the video featured snippets of a few major cases the department has solved. Twitter released an emoji of Minnal Murali on 23 December 2021, a day before the film's release.

Reception

Critical response 
On review aggregator website Rotten Tomatoes the movie has an approval score of 75% on the basis of 8 reviews with an average rating of 9.4 out of 10.

S. R. Praveen of The Hindu described the film as a "feel-good bolt from the sky" and noted that "despite banking on familiar superhero tropes, Basil Joseph and Tovino Thomas ensure that their film has a character of its own." Writing for Hindustan Times, Devarsi Ghosh wrote that Minnal Murali has "finally cracked the superhero formula for India." He appreciated the film's characterization, humour, performances, score and technical aspects calling it "a technical triumph at every turn," while also observing that the film "has the capacity to not just spawn a franchise, but perhaps even become an international hit." Deepa Soman of The Times of India gave three-and-a-half out of five, praising the score, performances, VFX, emotional weight, and character development calling the film a "modest and jocular entertainer with both a likeable superhero and villain".

Anna M. M. Vetticad of Firstpost gave the film, four out of five stars and praised the action sequences and said that the film is a "tender drama about a reluctant hero and the pain that is caused by the trivialisation of those who are viewed as the other". Further saying that "Basil Joseph's film may be a tribute to the Hollywood superhero genre and made on a larger budget than is the norm with Malayalam cinema, but it is also everything that the Malayalam New Wave of the past decade is loved for across India". Sajin Srijith of The New Indian Express stated Minnal Murali as "the best superhero film made in India" further saying "The film does something that most superhero movies rarely do. When the general approach is to make the audience start caring for the hero first, Basil Joseph's film elects to do the same with the villain. Minnal Murali impresses with its originality and its ability to evade comparisons to superheroes from the West." Shubhra Gupta of The Indian Express gave three-and-a-half out of five stars and wrote that "like all the best superhero movies, this is a coming-of-age film, where a lost child finally finds direction, knowing where he came from, and where he has to go. While the film is aware of its superhero-ness, it never loses sight of the fact that it is set in a real place. This is a tough balance, and Basil Joseph gets it just right." Saibal Chatterjee of NDTV gave 2.5/5 stars and wrote that "That is how Minnal Murali saunters along, embracing an all-too-literal manner and abandoning a sense of irony as it seeks to convince us that a Batman-like superhero is par for the course in Kerala. Are we writing off the film? Not at all. If nothing else, Minnal Murali aims high enough not to fall with a thud when its wings lose strength. It manages to stay afloat even when it dips precariously low." Business Line wrote that the film "stands out and is fun to watch despite a few cliché moments."

Rediff rated the film three out of five and wrote, "while Basil's idea and thought process of how a superhero is born is meant to win your heart, the plot may not necessarily inspire you." Sify gave four out of five and stated "Minnal Murali is a fun watch that keeps the possibility of some sequels alive". Behindwoods rated the film three out of five and gave a verdict "Minnal Murali is India's answer to Hollywood's Superhero movies, in its own ways". Nandini Ramanath of Scroll.in stated "Minnal Murali has an improvisational feel that matches the origin story of an unlikely saviour [...] Despite being overstretched, the saga of two superheroes for the price of a single ticket benefits from being pitched at the right scale." Sowmya Rajendran of The News Minute gave four out of five and stated "Minnal Murali hides its surprises well, and just when you've settled down to watch a comedy about a buffoonish superhero, it changes the game [...] Everyone knows that the superhero will save the day, but it requires superhuman effort to create a film that grabs your attention and makes you watch till the end, and Minnal Murali certainly ticks that box."

Audience viewership 
It is the third Indian film to be in Netflix's Global Top 10 list of non-English Movies. According to LiveMint, more than 5.9 million viewing hours being recorded for the film during its premiere on 24 December 2021.

Sequel
In an interview, actor Tovino Thomas said that a sequel for the film is being planned but it will happen in due course of time.

References

2021 films
2020s Malayalam-language films
Films postponed due to the COVID-19 pandemic
2021 direct-to-video films
Films scored by Shaan Rahman
Films scored by Sushin Shyam
Films not released in theaters due to the COVID-19 pandemic
Malayalam-language Netflix original films
Indian direct-to-video films
Indian superhero films
Films shot in Alappuzha
Films directed by Basil Joseph